The 1955 1000 km Buenos Aires took place on 23 January, on the Autódromo Municipal-Avenida Paz, (Buenos Aires, Argentina).  It was the second running of the race, and once again, it was opening round of the F.I.A. World Sports Car Championship. For this event, a longer section of the Autopista General Pablo Riccheri route was added, making the circuit 17.136 km in length.

Report

Entry

A grand total of 55 racing cars were registered for this event, of which all arrived for practice and qualifying. Although this was the first major sports car race of the year, the race was poorly supported by the work of teams. Only Ferrari and Equipe Gordini sent cars from Europe. Both teams were represented by two cars in the race. Ferrari send a Ferrari 376 S for Maurice Trintignant and José Froilán González, and a 750 Monza for Umberto Maglioli and Clemar Bucci. Meanwhile, France was represented by a Gordini T24S in the hands of Élie Bayol and Harry Schell, and a T15 for the Argentine pairing of Adolfo Schwelm Cruz and Pedro J. Llano. The remainders of the field were cars from South America.

Qualifying

The French Grand Prix racer, Trintignant took pole position for Scuderia Ferrari, in their Ferrari 376 S.

Race

The race was held over 58 laps of the 10.648 miles, Autódromo Municipal-Avenida Paz, giving a distance of 617.574 miles (993.888 km). In the race, both factory Ferraris were disqualified, leaving the privately entered Ferrari 375 Plus of Enrique Saenz Valiente and José-Maria Ibanez to win by nearing five minutes. Car number 4, took an impressive victory, winning in a time of 6hrs 35:15.4 mins., averaging a speed of 93.748 mph. In second was another locally prepared Ferrari, of Carlos Najurieta and César Rivero. The podium was complete by Equipo Presidente Peron’s Maserati A6GCS of José M. Faraoni and Ricardo Grandio, who were two laps adrift, but did win their class.

Official Classification

Class Winners are in Bold text.

 Fastest Lap: José Froilán González, 6:06.1secs (104.704 mph)

Class Winners

Standings after the race

Note: Only the top five positions are included in this set of standings.Championship points were awarded for the first six places in each race in the order of 8-6-4-3-2-1. Manufacturers were only awarded points for their highest finishing car with no points awarded for positions filled by additional cars. Only the best 4 results out of the 6 races could be retained by each manufacturer. Points earned but not counted towards the championship totals are listed within brackets in the above table.

References

1000 km Buenos Aires
1000 km Buenos Aires
Buenos Aires